Kullu Valley is a broad open valley in Himachal Pradesh, India, formed by the Beas River between Manali and Larji. This valley is famous for its temples, beauty and its majestic hills covered with pine and deodar forest and sprawling apple orchards. The course of the Beas river presents a succession of magnificent, clad with forests of deodar, towering above trees of pine on the lower rocky ridges. Kullu valley is sandwiched between the Pir Panjal, Lower Himalayan and Great Himalayan Ranges. Ski touring is a sport growing in popularity in the Himilayan peaks surrounding the valley.

Economy 
See Economy section in Kullu district.

Tourism 
For places of interest, festivals, and outdoor sports in the Kullu valley, see Attractions section in Kullu district.

Further reading 
See Further reading section in Kullu district.

Gallery

References

Valleys of Himachal Pradesh
Geography of Kullu district